This is a list of airports in Armenia, sorted by location.



Airports
As of January 2022, Armenia has three functional civil airports.

Other airports
As of 2020, there are 2 airports currently under reconstruction in Armenia, these include:

Military airports

Airstrips

See also 

 Armenian Air Force
 General Department of Civil Aviation of Armenia
 List of airlines of Armenia
 List of airports by ICAO code: U#UD – Armenia
 List of airports in the Republic of Artsakh
 List of the busiest airports in Armenia
 Transport in Armenia
 Wikipedia: WikiProject Aviation/Airline destination lists: Asia#Armenia

References 
 General Department of Civil Aviation of Armenia – Airport Information 
 
 
  – includes IATA codes
  – ICAO codes and coordinates
  – IATA codes, ICAO codes and coordinates

 
Armenia
Airports
Airports
Armenia
Armenia